Ascensión Chirivella Marín (Valencia, Spain, 28 January 1894 - Mexico, 1980) was the first female law graduate in Spain to practice as a lawyer. She specialized in civil law and was active in promoting women's rights, defending the benefits that the Second Republic promised to women: the right to vote, to hold political positions, to divorce, and envisioning the payment of child support, non-discrimination against women in parental rights, and in being widowed and remarried, unlike what is in the Civil Code of 1889.

References

1894 births
1980 deaths
People from Valencia
Spanish women lawyers
Spanish women's rights activists
20th-century Spanish lawyers